Koszhar (Qosjar) is a small village situated inside Kzyl-Orda, Kazakhstan, on the banks of Lake Qamystybas. The village's economy is based on camel farming and fishing. Koszhar is located west of the M32 highway, considered one of the most dangerous and poorly maintained highways in the world.

References

Populated places in Kyzylorda Region

kk:Қосжар